Wonderlick Entertainment is an Australian music company with its head office located in Sydney, Australia. It was founded by co-CEOs Gregg Donovan and Stu MacQueen in 2007, building on Donovan's existing list of clients. Donovan and MacQueen expanded from a management company into a full service music company, adding a joint venture record label with Sony Music (Wonderlick Recording Company) and a publishing company (Wonderlick Publishing). In 2019, The Music ranked Donovan and McQueen at number twenty-two in their "Power 50" ranking of top Australian music business personnel based on their management of Wonderlick.

In 2018 the company opened an office in New York City.

In October 2020, it was announced that Stu MacQueen and Dan Crannitch, both of Wonderlick, would be providing professional mentoring for the sixth Robert Stigwood Fellowship in South Australia.

Artists
Airbourne
Will Blume
Clews
Jess Day
Flowerkid
Grinspoon
Holy Holy
Phil Jamieson
Japanese Wallpaper
Montaigne
The Paper Kites
Josh Pyke
Amy Shark

References

External links

The Hot Seat: Gregg Donovan and Stu MacQueen, Wonderlick – August 2012 interview

2007 establishments in Australia
Australian independent record labels
Record labels based in Sydney
Record labels established in 2007